Fried egg jellyfish can refer to:

 Cotylorhiza tuberculata, a medium-sized jellyfish from the Mediterranean Sea
 Phacellophora camtschatica, a large jellyfish found in subarctic and temperate oceans around the world

Animal common name disambiguation pages